John Farquharson  may refer to:

John Farquharson, 3rd of Inverey (died 1698), Scottish Jacobite
John Farquharson (Jesuit) (1699–1782), Scottish Jesuit
John Farquharson (architect) (1847–1933) Scottish architect
John Farquharson (journalist) (1929–2016), Australian journalist

See also
John Farquharson Smith (born 1930), Scottish politician
John Farquharson McIntosh (1846–1918), Scottish engineer
Clan Farquharson